The Women's Water Polo First League (Női Országos Bajnokság I) is the premier Hungarian championship for women's water polo clubs. First held in 1984, it is currently contested by ten teams. The champion takes part in the Champions' Cup.

2017-18 teams
 BVSC Budapest
 Dunaújvárosi Egyetem
 Eger
 Ferencváros
 Honvéd
 Szeged
 Szentes
 Tatabánya
 UVSE
 UVSE Margitsziget

Previous winners 

 1984 :  Vasas
 1985 :  Vasas (2)
 1985/86 :  BVSC
 1986/87 :  Szentes
 1987/88 :  BVSC (2)
 1988/89 :  BVSC (3)
 1989/90 :  Szentes (2)
 1990/91 :  BVSC (4)
 1991/92 :  Szentes (3)
 1992/93 :  BVSC (5)
 1993/94 :  Szentes (4)
 1994/95 :  Szentes (5)
 1995/96 :  Szentes (6)
 1996/97 :  Szentes (7)
 1997/98 :  Szentes (8)
 1998/99 :  Szentes (9)
 1999/00 :  Szentes (10)
 2000/01 :  Dunaújváros
 2001/02 :  Dunaújváros (2)
 2002/03 :  Dunaújváros (3)
 2003/04 :  Dunaújváros (4)
 2004/05 :  Dunaújváros (5)
 2005/06 :  Honvéd
 2006/07 :  Honvéd (2)
 2007/08 :  Honvéd (3)
 2008/09 :  Dunaújváros (6)
 2009/10 :  Dunaújváros (7)
 2010/11 :  Dunaújváros (8)
 2011/12 :  Eger
 2012/13 :  Eger (2)
 2013/14 :  Szentes (11)
 2014/15 :  UVSE
 2015/16 :  UVSE (2)
 2016/17 :  UVSE (3)
 2017/18 :  UVSE (4)
 2018/19 :  UVSE (5)
 2018/20 :
 2018/21 :

Performances

Performance by club
The teams in Bold play in the 2018-19 season of OB I.

Performance by counties
The following table lists the Hungarian water polo champions by counties of Hungary.

 The bolded teams are currently playing in the 2017-18 season of the Hungarian League.

References

 
Sports leagues in Hungary
Hun
Recurring sporting events established in 1984
Professional sports leagues in Hungary